Sergeant First Class Thomas Franklin Vaughns (born July 7, 1920) is an American veteran who was a member of the famed group of World War II-era African-Americans known as the Tuskegee Airmen. He is a recipient of the National Defense Service Medal in 2019, for his service in the Korean War. He is also a member of the Arkansas Agriculture Hall of Fame.

Military service

World War II 

Vaughns was drafted his senior year of high school. In 1942 reported for duty at Camp Robinson. He was sent to basic training in Bakersfield, California. Vaughns was trained to be a mechanic for B-25 bombers. He was then transferred to Tuskegee along with 18 others.

Korean War
Vaughns signed up for the Army Reserves and when the Korean War began he was sent to Fort Hood where he served as a mechanic. In 1952 he was discharged as a Sergeant First Class.

Early life
Vaughns family owned a 50-acre farm in Felton, in rural Lee County, Arkansas. He attended Marianna High School in Arkansas. On July 12, 2020, on Vaughn's 100th birthday a drive-by parade honoring him took place. The parade was organized by the church he attends: Barraque Street Missionary Baptist Church

Awards
Congressional Gold Medal awarded to the Tuskegee Airmen in 2006
World War II Victory Medal
American Campaign Medal
National Defense Service Medal (2019)
Arkansas Agriculture Hall of Fame (2020)

Education
Marianna High School
Arkansas Agricultural, Mechanical & Normal College
University of Arkansas

Personal life
After WWII Vaughns returned home to Pine Bluff, Arkansas. There he worked in education. He also worked monitoring 4-H Club members. After WWII, he attended college and He married Luvada. He signed up for the Army Reserves and when the Korean War began he was sent to Fort Hood. In the 1950s he set up a program for farmer to sell their produce in Crittenden County, Arkansas and later in Pine Bluff, Arkansas. His programs provided employment for 1400 people. He spent the rest of his career occupied with agricultural teaching farming techniques.

See also
 Executive Order 9981
 Military history of African Americans
 The Tuskegee Airmen (movie)

Further reading
The Tuskegee Airmen: An Illustrated History, 1939–1949

References

Notes

External links
 Tuskegee Airmen at Tuskegee University
 Tuskegee Airmen Archives at the University of California, Riverside Libraries.
 Tuskegee Airmen, Inc.
 Tuskegee Airmen National Historic Site (U.S. National Park Service) 
 Tuskegee Airmen National Museum
 Fly (2009 play about the 332d Fighter Group)
Thomas Vaughns

1920 births
Living people
African-American centenarians
United States Army Air Forces personnel of World War II
Men centenarians
Congressional Gold Medal recipients
Tuskegee Airmen
United States Army Air Forces non-commissioned officers
United States Army non-commissioned officers
United States Army reservists
21st-century African-American people